The US SuperTour is a series of cross-country skiing events arranged by the International Ski Federation (FIS). It is one of the nine FIS Cross-Country Continental Cups, a second-level competition ranked below the Cross-Country World Cup. The US SuperTour is open for competitors from all nations, but are mainly a competition for skiers from the United States. 

The US Super Tour has been held since the 2001 season, and has been a part of the Cross-Country Continental Cup since 2004.

World Cup qualification
In the end of certain periods, the overall leaders for both genders receive a place in the World Cup in the following period. The overall winners of the season receive a place in the World Cup in the beginning of the following season.

Overall winners

Men

Women

References

External links
Official website

FIS Cross-Country Continental Cup
Recurring sporting events established in 2001